The Strawberry Trail is a 15-mile footpath through Hampshire, England

The trail is part linear and part circular.  The linear section connects Botley to Bursledon railway station via Manor Farm Country Park. The circular section is usually done in a clockwise direction.  From Bursledon railway station the trail goes south closely following the River Hamble and through Hamble until it meets Southampton Water.  The trail then turns right and follows the shoreline into Royal Victoria Country Park.  The path exits the Country Park next to the tearooms and twists and turns along a short nature trail until it meets the Hamble Rail Trail.  The path continues North along Hound Road then crosses farmland, turns right at a recreation ground, and returns to the railway station via the outskirts of Bursledon.

There are numerous pay car parks in the area, however it is recommended that walkers use the free car park just off Mortimer Road near Botley High Street.

In summer a ferry service operates between Hamble and Manor Farm Country Park.

The rural parts of the trail are waymarked in the clockwise direction by metal and plastic disks found attached to wooden and metal posts, trees and street furniture.  However, there are very few markers within the Royal Victoria Country Park and on the section that passes through the outskirts of Bursledon.

See also
Recreational walks in Hampshire
Long-distance footpaths in the UK

Footpaths in Hampshire